Kansas City International Airport  (originally Mid-Continent International Airport) is a public airport in Kansas City, Missouri, located  northwest of Downtown Kansas City in Platte County, Missouri. The airport opened in 1972 and replaced Kansas City Municipal Airport (MKC) with all scheduled passenger airline flights being moved from MKC to MCI. It serves the Kansas City Metropolitan Area and is the primary passenger airport for much of western Missouri and eastern Kansas.

The airport has always been a civilian airport and has never had an Air National Guard unit assigned to it. Since the shut-down of the 2020 pandemic, the number of peak-day scheduled aircraft departures has been steadily recovering. As of October, 2022, there were 303 daily arrivals and departures. Nonstop service was offered to 47 airports, including Cancun and Toronto.

History

Beginnings
Kansas City Industrial Airport was built after the Great Flood of 1951 destroyed the facilities of both of Kansas City's hometown airlines Mid-Continent Airlines and TWA at Fairfax Airport across the Missouri River from the city's main Kansas City Municipal Airport (which was not as badly damaged). TWA's main overhaul base was a former B-25 bomber factory at Fairfax, although TWA commercial flights flew out of the main downtown airport.

Kansas City was planning to build an airport with room for  runways and knew the downtown airport would not be large enough.

Kansas City already owned Grandview Airport south of the city with ample room for expansion, but the city chose to build a new airport north of the city away from the Missouri River following lobbying by Platte County native Jay B. Dillingham, president of the Kansas City Stockyards, which had also been destroyed in the flood. TWA moved its Fairfax plant to the new airport and also its overseas overhaul operations at New Castle County Airport in Delaware.

The site just north of the then-unincorporated hamlet of Hampton, Missouri, was picked in May 1953 (with an anticipated cost of $23 million) under the guidance of City Manager L.P. Cookingham. Cookingham Drive is now the main access road to the airport. Ground was broken in September 1954. The first runway opened in 1956; at about the same time the city donated the southern Grandview Airport to the United States Air Force to become Richards-Gebaur Air Force Base.

TWA's Kansas City Overhaul Base at its peak in the 1960s and 1970s was Kansas City's largest employer, with 6,000 employees.

Although Mid-Continent merged with Braniff in 1952, Kansas City decided to name the new airport on the basis of Mid-Continent's historic roots (serving the Mid-continent Oil Field).

In 1954, TWA signed an agreement to move its overhaul base to the airport; the city was to build and own the $18 million-base and lease it to TWA. However, the downtown airport continued to be Kansas City's passenger airport; a 1963 Federal Aviation Agency memo called the downtown airport "one of the poorest major airports in the country for large jet aircraft"  and recommended against spending any more federal dollars on it.

Along with the cramped site, there were doubts that the downtown site could handle the new Boeing 747. Jets had to make steep climbs and descents to avoid the downtown skyscrapers on the 200-ft (60-m) Missouri River bluffs at Quality Hill, east of the approach course a mile or two south of the south end of the runway, and downtown Kansas City was in the flight path for takeoffs and landings, resulting in a constant roar downtown. Mid-Continent was surrounded by open farmland.

On July 1, 1965, Continental Airlines Flight 12 overran the runway while landing at Kansas City Municipal Airport. The Civil Aeronautics Board determined that the pilots of the Boeing 707 had landed properly within the touchdown zone for their ILS approach, and despite deploying spoilers, thrust reversers, and brakes, the remaining runway distance was too short for them to safely stop in heavy rain and tailwind conditions. Despite attempts to improve the runway surface and improve braking performance, the Airline Pilots Association said that many commercial pilots continued to "blacklist" the airport. A new airport, with longer runways, would be required to satisfy regulatory runway safety area requirements.

TWA's "Airport of the Future"
In 1966, voters in a 24:1 margin approved a $150 million bond issue following a campaign by Mayor Ilus W. Davis to move the city's main airport to an expanded Mid-Continent.

The airport property was in an unincorporated area of Platte County until the small town of Platte City, Missouri, annexed the airport during construction. Kansas City eventually annexed the airport. Kivett and Myers designed the terminals and control tower; it was dedicated on October 23, 1972, by U.S. Vice President Spiro Agnew. Labor strife and interruptions raised its cost to $250 million. Kansas City renamed the airport Kansas City International Airport (although it kept MCI as its airport code). TWA, Braniff, and everyone moved to MCI.

Many design decisions were driven by TWA, which envisioned the facility as its hub, with 747s and Supersonic Transports whisking people from America's heartland to all points on the globe. Streets around the airport included Mexico City Avenue, Brasília Avenue, Paris Street, London Avenue, and Tel Aviv Avenue. TWA vetoed concepts to model the airport on Washington–Dulles and Tampa, because those two airports had people movers, which it deemed too expensive. TWA insisted on "Drive to Your Gate" with flight gates  from the roadway (signs along the roadway showed the flights leaving each gate).  The single-level terminals had no stairs, similar to a plan that would be built at Dallas/Fort Worth.

TWA's vision for the future of flight that had been pioneered by the TWA Flight Center at JFK Airport in New York City (which also featured cars close to the gates design) proved troublesome almost from the start. The terminals turned out to be unfriendly to the 747 since passengers spilled out of the gate area into the halls. When security checkpoints were added in the 1970s to stem hijackings, they were difficult and expensive to implement since security checkpoints had to be installed at each gate area rather than at a centralized area. As a result, passenger services were nonexistent downstream of the security checkpoint in the gate area. No restrooms were available, and shops, restaurants, newsstands, ATMs or any other passenger services were not available without exiting the secure area and being re-screened upon re-entry.

Shortly after the airport opened, TWA asked that the terminals be rebuilt to address these issues. Kansas City, citing the massive cost overruns on a newly built airport to TWA specification, refused, prompting TWA to move its hub to St. Louis.

Recent years
After the establishment of the Transportation Security Administration (TSA), MCI was one of five airports where the TSA has experimented with using independent contractors to inspect travelers. The airport uses AKAL Security, an independent contractor that conforms to TSA's recruiting and training standards. TSA supervises these independent contractors, but they are not federal employees.

A $258 million terminal renovation was completed in November 2004. Improvements included, amongst other things, increasing the size of each structural bay to provide larger spaces for vestibules, concessions, retail and public seating as well as new bathrooms inside security. Following the renovations, all three terminals included blue terrazzo floors. In May 2007, the final portion of the project, a new rental car facility and additional art fixtures, were completed.

In March 2010, the Transportation Security Administration announced that the airport would be one of the first in the U.S. to have full-body scanners with the first one used at Southwest Airlines beginning in the summer of 2010.

Despite requests from Kansas City, the airport has been unable to change its original International Air Transport Association (IATA) Mid-Continent designation of MCI, which had already been registered on navigational charts. Further complicating requests to change the designation, the Federal Communications Commission (FCC) at the time reserved all call letters with "K" or "W" for radio and television stations, so KCI was not viable. The "W" and "K" restrictions have since been lifted, but the IATA is reluctant to change names that have appeared on navigational charts. The "KCI" designation is also already assigned to another airport, Kon Airport in East Timor, so that one would have to change, adding delay and confusion. Nearby New Century AirCenter also carries the IATA code JCI (although the FAA refers to it as IXD and the ICAO as KIXD), which could also lead to confusion.

Icelandair launched Kansas City's first transatlantic flight in May 2018, using Boeing 757's to connect the airport with its Reykjavik hub. As the airline reviewed its route network in the wake of the Boeing 737 MAX groundings, it announced in late 2019 that the service would not return for the following summer season.

In March 2019, construction began on a new single terminal on the site of the former Terminal A. This project, which fulfilled a longstanding goal to replace the aging three terminals, opened on February 28, 2023. The new single terminal is designed by SOM Architects. It features spacious gate areas, nearly 50 local and national food and beverage, and shopping experiences. The facility opens with 40 gates and the ability to expand up to 50 gates in the future. Two moving walkways expedite transfers between the two concourses to make navigating the airport a better experience. Consolidated and flexible security checkpoints with 16 lanes were designed to accommodate the ebb and flow of passenger volume. The new 6,200-space garage is adjacent to the terminal with plenty of close-in, covered parking.

Planners strove to make the New Terminal the most accessible airport terminal in the US with gradual slopes, a Variety KC inclusive play area for children of all abilities, sensory and quiet rooms for those who have sensory disorders, infant feeding  rooms, and service animal relief areas. The Kansas City Air Travel Experience is a partial airliner adapted for individuals with anxiety or other conditions that may make them fearful of flying.

A boost of international flights has been taking place, with Southwest Airlines beginning service to Montego Bay and San José del Cabo in October 2023. MCI is also looking to Missouri and Kansas for starting a transatlantic flight by 2024.

Facilities

Terminals
The airport contains a single terminal with two concourses and a total of 40 gates.
Concourse A contains 13 gates.
Concourse B contains 27 gates.

Former Terminals

Terminal A (1972-2014) 
Terminal A was one of the three former terminals that operated at MCI. It was on the site on the now-opened single terminal and housed gates 1-30, and was used by airlines such as US Airways, United, and AirTran. In the early 2010s, air traffic decreased at Terminal A as airlines left due to airline mergers or, in the case of United, Air Canada, and US Airways, switched terminals. By 2014, US Airways was the only airline left operating there, and United and Air Canada's move to Terminal C in 2013 left most of Terminal A vacant. Eventually, US Airways pulled out of Terminal A on January 8, 2014, the last airline to ever operate out of Terminal A. It was only used for sports teams and police training until its demolition in 2019.

Terminals B and C (1972-2023) 
Terminals B and C were the other terminals at MCI that operated alongside Terminal A. Terminal B housed gates 31-60 and Terminal C housed gates 61-90. Terminal B was mainly used by MCI's largest carriers, Southwest Airlines and Delta Air Lines. Terminal C also housed an international arrivals area near Gate 90. In 2018, Terminal C underwent renovations, which saw a new layout and a new international arrivals area. Eventually, Terminals B and C closed for good on the morning of February 28, 2023, when the final arriving flight was carried out. Airport officials plan to demolish the structures in the summer, but will keep the parking garages. Garage B will become a space employee parking, replacing a surface lot, and Garage C will become another parking option.

Ground transportation
The airport is near major highways Interstate 29 and Interstate 435.

The airport has a consolidated rental car facility at the corners of London and Paris and Bern and London Streets on the airport property. Each terminal has four rental car shuttle bus stops. The shuttle buses are operated by First Transit and REM Inc. The buses used for the shuttle service are  Gillig low-floor buses. These are silver in color and indicate RENTAL CAR SHUTTLE BUS on the side. The shuttles come through the terminal every two to five minutes and are free of charge for all passengers and guests of the airport.

, The Kansas City Area Transportation Authority has implemented improvements to the public bus service to the airport. Route 229 services the airport on about 18 trips per weekday, with the first bus departing at 5:32 a.m. and the last at 11:17 p.m. The bus also operates 18 round trips on Saturday and Sunday. The bus services all active terminals and provides service to the 12th and Charlotte East Village transit center in Downtown Kansas City, with intermediate stops. Systemwide fare is free.

A number of private scheduled shared shuttle services operate from MCI to regional cities (including Saint Joseph, Missouri; Columbia, Missouri; Topeka, Kansas; Lawrence, Kansas); and military bases (Fort Leonard Wood, Missouri; Fort Riley, Kansas; Fort Leavenworth, Kansas; and Whiteman Air Force Base, Missouri).

Airlines and destinations

Passenger

Cargo

Statistics

Top destinations

Airline market share

Airport traffic

Accidents and incidents
 April 13, 1987 Buffalo Airways (of Waco TX) Flight 721 operated by Burlington Air Express cargo flight from Wichita Mid-Continent Airport descending in a thick fog with half-mile visibility clipped a 950-ft-high ridge three miles (5 km) short of the runway. All four occupants were killed the worst accident in the airport's history.
The flight then landed in Salina, Kansas. None of the 64 persons on board were injured.
 February 16, 1995 Air Transport International Flight 782, McDonnell Douglas DC-8 flight to Westover Metropolitan Airport, which had aborted a take off six minutes before because of loss of directional control, crashed on Runway 1L on another take-off because of failure of the directional control when its tail hit the runway.  All three on board were killed.
 August 21, 2001 At 01:11, an America West Airlines Boeing 737-300 operating as Flight 598 from Phoenix Sky Harbor Airport touched down on Runway 27 to the left of the center line during severe weather. The first officer in command failed to correct for leftward drift and the aircraft exited the runway approximately 1,000 feet after touchdown. Both engines were destroyed by foreign object debris, but the aircraft was repaired and returned to service. No fatalities and only one injury were reported by the 53 passengers and 6 crew.
 July 16, 2014 An Embraer E170 scheduled to operate US Airways Flight 3408 to Ronald Reagan Washington National Airport veered off runway 19L while conducting a high-speed taxi for maintenance purposes. Neither of the two maintenance crew on board were injured. No passengers were on board at the time of the incident.

Wildlife strikes
In 2009, the airport was reported as having the highest number of wildlife strikes of any airport in the US, based on take-offs and landings (57 per 100,000). FAA records showed 146 strikes in 2008, up from 37 in 2000.

Furthermore, in 2007, the airport elected to enact a policy of 100% submitting wildlife strike reports to the FAA/USDA National Strike Database. When birds are involved in a strike, whether reported by an aircraft owner or operator, or the bird was found on the runway, feathers or DNA samples are recovered and sent to the Smithsonian Institution for positive identification. This documentation is conducted regardless of whether the strike occurred on or off the airfield.

In the reporting period of January 1990 to September 2008, none of the encounters resulted in injury to people and all of the airplanes landed safely. The report listed the most serious incidents.
 February 25, 1999 A Learjet 35 approaching Downtown Kansas City Airport struck a flock of snow geese over MCI. One hit the copilot's window, and one was ingested into an engine, shutting it down. It landed safely.
 March 4, 1999 A DC-9 landing at the airport struck a flock of snow geese, ingesting geese in both engines and shutting one down. The airplane landed safely.
 April 28, 2000 A Boeing 727 on take-off struck a Canada goose, destroying an engine. It returned safely.
 June 10, 2005 A DC-9 on takeoff struck an American kestrel, stalling an engine. It returned safely.
 March 31, 2006 A Boeing 737 struck a medium to large bird and damaged an engine on take-off. It returned safely.
 November 14, 2009 Frontier Airlines Flight 820, an Airbus A319, to Denver, struck a flock of Canada geese shortly after take-off, resulting in loss of power to an engine. The airplane made a safe return to MCI.

Notes

References

External links

 
 

1956 establishments in Missouri
Airports established in 1956
Airports in Missouri
Buildings and structures in Platte County, Missouri
Transportation buildings and structures in Kansas City, Missouri